Tarjanli (also Romanized as Tarjanlī) is a village in Qaravolan Rural District, Loveh District, Galikash County, Golestan Province, Iran. At the 2006 census, its population was 1,162, in 313 families.

References 

Populated places in Galikash County